In Greek mythology, Atlanteia or Atlantia (Ancient Greek: Ἀτλαντείης) was a Hamadryad nymph who consorted with King Danaus of Libya and perhaps the mother of some of the Danaïdes: Hippodamia, Rhodia, Cleopatra, Asteria, Hippodamia, Glauce, Hippomedusa, Gorge, Iphimedusa, and Rhode.

Apollodorus only identified these daughters of Danaus by Atlantia and Phoebe (another hamadryad), not specifying who was the daughter of the other. These ten women joined the sons of King Aegyptus of Egypt who were begotten on an Arabian woman. Later on, these princesses slayed their cousin-husbands during their wedding night.

According to Hippostratus, Danaus had all of his progeny by a single woman, Europe, daughter of the river-god Nilus. In some accounts, he married his cousin Melia, daughter of Agenor, king of Tyre.

Notes

References 

 Apollodorus, The Library with an English Translation by Sir James George Frazer, F.B.A., F.R.S. in 2 Volumes, Cambridge, MA, Harvard University Press; London, William Heinemann Ltd. 1921. . Online version at the Perseus Digital Library. Greek text available from the same website.
John Tzetzes, Book of Histories, Book VII-VIII translated by Vasiliki Dogani from the original Greek of T. Kiessling's edition of 1826.  Online version at theio.com

Hamadryad
Women in Greek mythology